Horst Fischer (1912–1966) was a German doctor executed for war crimes.

Horst Fischer may also refer to:
 Horst Fischer (lawyer) (born 1950), German lawyer and academic
 Horst Fischer (musician) (1930–1986), German trumpeter

See also
 Horst Fascher (born 1936), German music manager and associate of the Beatles